Captain Mohiuddin Jahangir was a Pakistan Army office who joined the Mukti Bahini during the 1971 Liberation War. He was born on 7 March 1949 in the village of Rahimgonj under Babugonj Upazila of Barisal district, East Pakistan. He was an officer in Sector 7 of the Muktibahini and was killed while attempting to breakthrough enemy defenses on the bank of the Mahananda River. His initiative seriously undermined the Pakistani Army's resistance in the area; eventually allowing, the Muktibahini to overcame the positions of the Pakistan army. The main gate of Dhaka Cantonment, "Shaheed Jahangir Gate", is named in his honor.

He was awarded the highest recognition of bravery in Bangladesh.

Early life

Mohiuddin Jahangir was born on 7 March 1949 at Rahimganj, Babuganj upazila in Barisal district, East Pakistan. His primary education was at the Patarchar Primary School in Muladi. He achieved scholarships in talent pool in his 5th and 8th grade. He passed his SSC examination from Muladi Mahbudjan High School in 1964. He finished his HSC from the Barisal BM College in 1966. In 1967 he enrolled at the department of Statistics at the University of Dhaka.  On 5 October 1967 he joined the Pakistan Army as a cadet at the Pakistan Military Academy. After successfully completing his training with the 15th war course, Jahangir was commissioned in the Corps of Engineers. Later he was posted at 173 Engineer's Battalion in Multan. After working with the Battalion for six months, he was shifted to Military College of Engineering in Risalpur. After finishing the 13-month-long training he took bomb-disposal training.

Involvement in the war
In 1971 Mohiuddin Jahangir was working at the construction field at Karakoram. On 10 June 1971, he took a few days leave and went back to Risalpur. A day later, he started towards the Sialkot border to reach India. He managed to cross the border and joined the Mukti Bahini at Mehdipur under Malda district in West Bengal. On 3 July, he became a captain of sector 7, Mohodipur . He was given the responsibility to fight at the Chapai Nawabganj border at Rajshahi district. In December he was ordered to take Chapai Nawabganj. On 14 December he died after being shot during a battle near Nawabganj. He was buried near Sona Mosque premises and later was posthumously declared "Bir Shrestho". This award is one of the most highly honored awards in Bangladesh.

Death

In December 1971, Mohiuddin Jahangir was made the captain of a team in order to take control of Chapai Nawabganj from the Pakistanis. He set his camp at a place called Barghoria at the west of Nawabganj on 10 December. On 13 December Mohiuddin Jahangir divided his force into three groups in order to attack enemy camps at Chapai Nababganj and Rajshahi. One team, led by Lieutenant Rafiq, crossed Mohananda and proceeded towards Rohonpur-Nachole-Anupura and Nawabganj. The second team crossed the Mahananda River and marched towards the city. At this point Mohiuddin Jahangir failed to establish any advantage over the enemy, so he continued with his team and crossed Mahananda and camped at Rehaichar before dawn. He intended to destroy one of the light machine gun bunkers of the Pakistan Army and crawled towards it. He managed to get close to the bunker and threw a grenade, but was shot dead a bullet hit his forehead from another house roof. He was shot from a sniper rifle. He wore a green lungi & a gray genji & a gamcha around his wrist. Pakistani Soldiers didn't recognize him as an officer as he looked like an ordinary soldier. His code name was "Tiger". His fellow Comrades responded on the radio "Tiger is dead". He died at the battlefield in Rehaichar Moholla in Chapainawabganj town. He was buried in Choto Shona Mosque premises at Mehdipur where most of his activities had taken place during the war. Later he was announced Bir Shrestho.

Legacy

Birshreshtha Shaheed Captain Mohiuddin Jahangir College at Swarupnagar was named after him. The main gate of Dhaka Cantonment, "Shaheed Jahangir Gate", is named in his honour. Also, a college called Mohiuddin Jahangir College was named after him as well.

Gallery

References

1949 births
1971 deaths
Bangladeshi military personnel
People killed in the Bangladesh Liberation War
Pakistani defectors
Recipients of the Bir Sreshtho
People from Barisal
Brojomohun College alumni
Mukti Bahini personnel
Pakistan Army officers